A statue of Jorge Matute Remus is installed in front of a Telmex building on Juárez Avenue, in Centro, Guadalajara, in the Mexican state of Jalisco. The statue simulates Matute Remus pushing the building backwards. In August 2018, its bronze plaque was stolen.

References

External links

 

Centro, Guadalajara
Monuments and memorials in Jalisco
Outdoor sculptures in Guadalajara
Sculptures of men in Mexico
Statues in Jalisco